Miss Universe 1983, the 32nd Miss Universe pageant, was held on 11 July 1983 at the Kiel Auditorium in St. Louis, Missouri, United States. Lorraine Downes of New Zealand was crowned by Karen Dianne Baldwin of Canada. Eighty contestants competed in this year. This is the first, and so far the only time New Zealand won the pageant.

Results

Placements
{| class="wikitable sortable" style="font-size:95%;"
|- 
! Final results
! Contestant
|-
| Miss Universe 1983
|
  –  Lorraine Downes
|-
| 1st Runner-up|
  – Julie Hayek
|-
| 2nd Runner-up|
  – Roberta Brown
|-
| 3rd Runner-up|
  – Lolita Morena
|-
| 4th Runner-up|
  – Karen Moore
|-
| Top 12|
  – Nina Rekola
  – Loana Radecki
  – Federica Moro
  – Karen Dobloug
  – Kathie Lee Lee Beng
  – Ana Herrero
  – Paola Ruggeri
|}

 Final Competition Order Of AnnouncementsTop 12Top 5Contestants

  – María Daniela Carara
  – Milva Evertsz
  – Simone Cox
  – Mercedes Stermitz
  – Christina Thompson
  – Françoise Bostoen
  – Shirlene Dianne McKay
  – Angelita Diaz
   – Cecilia Zamora
  – Mariza Fully Coelho †
  – Anna Maria Joseph
  – Jodi Yvonne Rutledge
  – Effie Ebanks
   – María Josefa Isensee Ugarte
   – Julie Pauline Sáenz Starnes
  – Carmena Blake
  – María Gabriela Pozuelo
  – Maybelline Altagracia Snel
  – Marina Elena Rauscher
  – Inge Ravn Thomsen
  – Alexandra Astwood
  – Mariela García
  – Claudia Oliva
  – Karen Moore
  – Nina Marjaana Rekkola
  – Frederique Leroy
  – Marie Georges Achamana
  – Abbey Scattrel Janneh
  – Loana Katharina Radecki
  – Louise Gillingwater
  – Plousia Farfaraki
  – Nicole LeBorgne
  – Pamela Booth
  – Berta Victoria Gonzales
  – Nancy Lalleman Heynis
  – Ollie Thompson
  – Cherona Yeung
  – Unnur Steinsson
  – Rekha Hande
  – Andi Botenri
  – Roberta Brown
  – Shimona Hollender
  – Federica Moro
  – Yuko Yamaguchi
  – Jong-jun Kim
  – May Mansour Chahwan
  – Puspa Mohammed
  – Christine Bonnici
  – Marie Line Laupa
  – Monica Rosas
  – Astrid Klotzsch
  – Lorraine Elizabeth Downes  – Thelma Mafnas
  – Karen Elisabeth Dobloug
  – Elizabeth Bylan Bennett
  – Shannelle Bray
  – Mercedes Bosch
  – Vivien Griffiths
  – Rosita Cornel Capuyon
  – Anabella Elisa Ananiades
  – Carmen Batíz Vergara
  – Eliane LeBeau
  – Linda Renton
  – Kathie Lee Lee Beng
  – Leanne Hosking
  – Ana Isabela Herrero
  – Shyama Fernando
  – Viveca Miriam Jung
  – Lolita Morena
  – Jinda Nernkrang
  – Nomxousi Xokelelo
  – Sandra Williams
  – Dilara Haracci
  – Lolita Ariza
  – María Jacqueline Beltrán
  – Julie Hayek
  – Julie Elizabeth Woods
  – Paola Ruggeri
  – Lianne Gray
  – Falute Mama Aluni

 Celebrity judges 
 Irene Saez - Miss Universe 1981 winner
 Lewis Collins
 Rosemary Rogers
 Soon-Tek Oh
 Patricia Neary
 Peter Diamandis
 Marlin Perkins
 Ken Norton
 Rocío Jurado
 Erol Evgin
 Ruby Keeler

Awards
  - Miss Amity (Abbey Scattrel Janneh)
  - Miss Photogenic (Lolita Morena)
 ''' - Best National Costume (Jong-jun Kim)

Notes

Debuts

Withdrawals

Returns

Last competed in 1977: 

 

Last competed in 1978: 

 

Last competed in 1981:

General references

External links
 Miss Universe official website

1983
1983 beauty pageants
Beauty pageants in the United States
1983 in Missouri
Events in St. Louis
July 1983 events in the United States